is a game released for the Super Nintendo Entertainment System in 1995. It is the third installment in the Super Bomberman series, and the third Bomberman game to be released for the system. Up to five players can play at the same time. The game was released in Japan and the PAL region, but not in North America due to the closure of Hudson Soft USA.

Gameplay 

This game scales back a lot of gameplay additions made in Bomberman '94 and Super Bomberman 2 and returns to the classic formula. As for multiplayer, the game adds a lot over the previous game by adding more characters, each representing a country of Earth (including one of the villains, Pretty Bomber, as France, which marks her first appearance as a non-enemy character). There are also new cutscenes for the Story mode, which centers around the resurrection of the Five Dastardly Bombers who were previously defeated in Super Bomberman 2, as White Bomber and Black Bomber adventure across various element themed stars in which the Five are causing havoc, under the rule of their creator, Bagular.

The overall animation graphics changed with the third installment; unlike Super Bomberman and Super Bomberman 2, the third sequel's graphics were simplified, which look similar to the graphics of the Bomberman games for the PC Engine, and most of the music in the game are remixed versions of previous older Bomberman soundtracks. Super Bomberman 3 was notably the first installment in the series that allowed for up to five players in Battle Mode, as the first two installments only allowed up to four.

Plot
One night, Bagular enters a junkyard inside of his UFO. He finds the bodies of the five Dastardly Bombers, and then sucks them into his UFO. Upon doing that, he sets all five on tables, and begins working on reviving them! Upon hearing this, White Bomber and Black Bomber set out to stop the five Dastardly Bombers, and ultimately defeat Bagular himself. The two set out to save the day once again!

Development and release

Reception 

On release, Famitsu scored the game a 28 out of 40. The game sold over 612,000 copies in Japan alone.

Notes

References

External links 
 Super Bomberman 3 - Hudson Game Navi at Hudson Soft (Japanese) on Wayback Machine
 Super Bomberman 3 at GameFAQs
 Super Bomberman 3 at Giant Bomb
 Super Bomberman 3 at MobyGames

1995 video games
Action video games
Bomberman
Cooperative video games
Hudson Soft games
Maze games
Multiplayer and single-player video games
Science fiction video games
Super Nintendo Entertainment System games
Super Nintendo Entertainment System-only games
Top-down video games
Video games developed in Japan
Video games scored by Jun Chikuma